The black korhaans are two closely related species of bustard:

 Northern black korhaan (Afrotis afraoides), also known as the white-quilled bustard
 Southern black korhaan (Afrotis afra)

Afrotis
Birds by common name